Chris Evert defeated the defending champion Martina Navratilova in a rematch of the previous year's final, 6–3, 2–6, 6–3 to win the women's singles tennis title at the 1982 Australian Open. It was her first Australian Open singles title and her 14th major singles title overall. With the win, Evert completed the career Grand Slam.

Seeds
The seeded players are listed below. Chris Evert is the champion; others show the round in which they were eliminated.

  Martina Navratilova (final)
  Chris Evert (champion)
  Andrea Jaeger (semifinals)
  Wendy Turnbull (quarterfinals)
  Pam Shriver (semifinals)
  Hana Mandlíková (second round)
  Barbara Potter (third round)
  Mima Jaušovec (second round)
  Billie Jean King (quarterfinals)
  Anne Smith (quarterfinals)
  Andrea Leand (second round)
  Zina Garrison (first round)
  Evonne Cawley (second round)
  Rosalyn Fairbank (third round)
  Claudia Kohde-Kilsch (third round)
  Helena Suková (first round)

Qualifying

Draw

Key
 Q = Qualifier
 WC = Wild card
 LL = Lucky loser
 r = Retired

Finals

Earlier rounds

Section 1

Section 2

Section 3

Section 4

See also
 Evert–Navratilova rivalry

External links
 1982 Australian Open – Women's draws and results at the International Tennis Federation

Women's singles
Australian Open (tennis) by year – Women's singles
1982 in Australian women's sport
1982 WTA Tour